God forbid is an idiom meaning "I hope it does not happen". Other uses may include:

God Forbid, American metal band

See also
Heaven Forbid